These are the full results of the 2022 South American Indoor Championships in Athletics which took place in Cochabamba, Bolivia, on 19 to 20 February at the Estadio de Atletismo del Gobierno Autónomo Municipal de Cochabamba.

Men's results

60 meters

Heats – February 19

Final – February 19

400 meters

Heats – February 19

Final – February 20

800 meters
February 20

1500 meters
February 19

3000 meters
February 20

60 meters hurdles
February 20

4 × 400 meters relay
February 20

High jump
February 20

Pole vault
February 19

Long jump
February 20

Triple jump
February 20

Shot put
February 20

Heptathlon
February 19–20

Women's results

60 meters
February 19

400 meters
February 20

800 meters
February 20

1500 meters
February 19

3000 meters
February 20

60 meters hurdles
February 20

4 × 400 meters relay
February 20

High jump
February 20

Pole vault
February 20

Long jump
February 19

Triple jump
February 20

Shot put
February 19

Pentathlon
February 19

References

South American Indoor Championships in Athletics - Results
South American Indoor Championships in Athletics